Gladioglanis is a genus of three-barbeled catfishes native to South America.

Species
There are currently three recognized species in this genus:
 Gladioglanis anacanthus M. S. Rocha, R. R. de Oliveira & Rapp Py-Daniel, 2008
 Gladioglanis conquistador Lundberg, Bornbusch & Mago-Leccia, 1991
 Gladioglanis machadoi Ferraris & Mago-Leccia, 1989

References

Heptapteridae
Fish of South America
Catfish genera
Taxa named by Francisco Mago Leccia
Freshwater fish genera